This is a list of organizations based in Antarctica.

Organizations based in Antarctica
 Antarctic and Southern Ocean Coalition

Antarctic agencies

 Antarctica New Zealand
 Argentine Antarctic Program
 Australian Antarctic Division
 Brazilian Antarctic Program
 British Antarctic Survey
 Instituto Antártico Argentino
 Instituto Antártico Chileno
 IPEVFrench Polar Institute
 National Antarctic Research Program
 New Zealand Antarctic Place-Names Committee
 Norwegian Polar Institute
 Tasmanian polar network
 United States Antarctic Program

Museums in Antarctica

 Discovery Hut
 Port Lockroy base
 Scott's Hut
 South Georgia Museum

See also
 Scouting in the Antarctic

References

 
Organizations based in Antarctica, List
Antarctica